Massimo Volume is an Italian rock group formed in Bologna in 1992. They sing in Italian and the singer is well known for his poetic spoken-word style. Their musical style may be described as being akin to post-rock: their sound is built on guitars and drums, but rhythms are often complex and articulated, while the guitar effects are also used to effect. The structure of their songs avoid completely the verse-chorus form: in its place, their pieces tend to describe an atmosphere or a sound-scape complemented by the spoken words. 

Massimo Volume reached some notoriety in the Italian Independent Music scene in the late 1990s, particularly with the release of critically acclaimed "Lungo i Bordi" and "Club Privé". The band dismantled in the early 2000s: during this period, their bassist and lyricist, Emidio Clementi, published a series of books. However, the band reunited again in the late 2000s and in 2010 released new material collected in the CD "Cattive Abitudini" (translating as "Bad Habits"), which has been followed by another CD in 2013 "Aspettando i Barbari" (translating as "Waiting for the Barbarians").

Discography

LP
 Stanze, Underground Records 1993
 Lungo i bordi, Mescal 1995
 Da qui, Mescal 1997
 Club Privé, Mescal, 1999
 Cattive Abitudini, La Tempesta 2010
 Aspettando i Barbari, La Tempesta 2013
 Il Nuotatore, 42 Records 2019

Compilations
 Fuoco fatuo in Metal Machine Muzak, 1997

Soundtracks
 Almost Blue, Cecchi Gori Music 2001

Singles/Music Videos 
 1995 - Il Primo Dio
 2010 - Fausto
 2011 - Un Altro Domani
 2013 - La Cena

Line-up
 Emidio Clementi: bass, vocals
 Egle Sommacal: guitars
 Vittoria Burattini: drums, percussions

Other members
 Gabriele Ceci - guitars (1991–1997)
 Umberto Palazzo - guitars, vocals (1991–1992)
 Metello Orsini - guitars (1997–1999)
 Marcella Riccardi - guitars, vocals (1999–2002)
 Dario Parisini - guitars (1999–2000)
 Stefano Pilia - guitars (2008)

External links
 Official website

Italian progressive rock groups
Italian post-rock groups